"Hold You Down" is a 2005 song by Jennifer Lopez and Fat Joe

"Hold You Down" may also refer to:

Music
"Hold You Down" (The Alchemist song), song by The Alchemist featuring Nina Sky & Prodigy
"Hold You Down" (DJ Khaled song), song by DJ Khaled featuring Chris Brown, August Alsina, Future, Jeremih
"Hold You Down" (X Ambassadors song), song by the American band X Ambassadors
"Hold You Down", song by Childish Gambino from Camp
"Hold You Down", song by Magnapop from the albums Rubbing Doesn't Help and Fire All Your Guns at Once
"Hold You Down", single by Jadakiss from I Love You (A Dedication to My Fans)
"Hold You Down", single by Kareem Rush
"Hold You Down", song by Tim Dog from BX Warrior
"Hold You Down", song by rapper Red Café with guest appearance by Teyana Taylor
"Hold You Down", song by rapper Raekwon featuring Faith Evans from Lost Jewlry
"Hold You Down", song by band Jump Little Children from Between the Dim & the Dark
"Hold You Down", song by Snow Tha Product from Good Nights & Bad Mornings 2: The Hangover
"Hold You Down", song by band Sultans from Ghost Ship
"Hold You Down", song by Jon B from Holiday Wishes: From Me to You
"Hold You Down", song by rapper Freeway from Freedom of Speech
"Hold You Down" (remix), by Laws feat. Big K.R.I.T. & Emilio Rojas  2010  Derek Pike
"Everything (Hold You Down)", by Killer Mike from Pledge

Television
"Hold You Down", episode of reality TV show Love & Hip Hop